Below are the squads for the Football at the 1975 Mediterranean Games, hosted in Algiers, Algeria, and took place between 24 August and 6 September 1975.

Group A

Algeria B
Coach: Rachid Mekhloufi

Egypt
Coach:  Burkhard Pape

France B
Coach:

Libye

Greece Ol.

Group B

Morocco
Coach:  Virgil Mărdărescu

Tunisia
Coach: Abdelmajid Chetali

Turkey B

Yugoslavia Ol.

References

Sports at the 1975 Mediterranean Games
Mediterranean Games football squads